Harrismith is a small town in the Wheatbelt region of Western Australia, approximately  south-east of Perth between the towns of Wickepin and Kulin.

History
When a railway was being constructed from Narrogin to Kondinin in 1914, the government placed a siding at this location, naming it "South Dorakin". However, local settlers opposed the name, and suggested Harrismith, after Harry Smith, the first settler in the vicinity. The name change was approved and the town was gazetted in 1915.

Present day
The town has a small hotel and caravan park as well as sports facilities. Other services are offered from nearby Tincurrin. The area around Harrismith is home to wildflowers in spring, especially verticordia.

References

Towns in Western Australia
Wheatbelt (Western Australia)